The Lion-Hunts of Amenhotep III During the First Ten Years of his Reign is one of a group of five historical and commemorative scarabs made during the reign of Amenhotep III. The set of five scarabs were presumably used to validate, and proclaim his choice of Tiye as his wife. (Both were extremely young, not yet teenagers.)

Each of the five scarabs begin with the identical name pronunciation of Amenhotep, and then the addressing of his wife, Tiye.

Scarab specifics

Because the five memorial scarabs were for public dissemination, multiple copies were made and circulated. Kerrigan's book has a photo of the scarab from the Oriental Institute, Chicago. Budge's reference translates a British Museum scarab-(B.M. 4096), of eight lines of text. The Oriental Institute scarab is also a text of eight lines, but has minor variations from the British Museum scarab; the scarab is pictured in the section for Tiy's Wedding Scarab, but there is no photo of Tiy's Wedding scarab. Instead they use the photo of Amenhotep's Lion Hunts.

Since copies of the five scarabs were made for dissemination, they have been claimed to be a form of "public information reading", much like a news release from a newspaper.

The lion hunt story, line-by-line
The translation of the lion-hunt story in the first ten years of Amenhotep's reign is:

(following introduction): Amenhotep's name and Tiye's name;
List of the lions brought in His Majesty by his own shooting, beginning with year 1-(="renpet") up to year X. Lions fierce 102 (!)

Line-by-line

line.5.5r:Aa1*t-(list-of)-E22:Z2ss-(lions)
line.6W25-.:N35:N35-(Brought-In)-U36-Z1-f-(majesty-his)-m-(by)
line.6.5.:t-F29-.:t-f-(his-shooting)-I10:O34:f-(his-own)-M8-A-D36:Y1-(beginning)
line.7m-(with)-M4-t:N5-Z1-(year1)-nfr i-i-(up)-t-r-(to)-M4-t:N5-V20-(year10)-E22-(lions)
line.8H-s-Aa18-A-(fierce)-Z7-Z1-Z1-(102)

List of the five scarabs

The Wild-Cattle Hunt by Amenhotep III in the IInd Year of his Reign-(2nd year)
Scarab Giving the Names of the Father and Mother of Queen Ti
The Lion-Hunts of Amenhotep III During the First Ten Years of his Reign
The Arrival in Egypt of Gilukhipa, the Mitannian Bride of Amenhotep III, in the Tenth Year of his Reign
The Construction of a Lake in Western Thebes for Queen Ti by Amenhotep III in the Eleventh Year of his Reign

Complete scarab BM 4096
Introduction with wife Tiye, and entire 8 lines of scarab BM 4096:

Horus the living one, bull mighty diademed(crowned) with Maat(Truth), Nebty-(Two Ladies), Stablisher of laws, pacifier of the Two Lands, Horus of Gold, Mighty of Thigh, Smiter of the Nomads, King of the South and the North, Neb-Maat-Ra, Son of Amenhotep, Governor of Thebes, Given Life, King's Woman, Tiye, Living One-("Living One, Like Ra", Ra not on this scarab); (in Tutankhamun's reign for Ankhesenamun, "May She Live")

List of the lions brought in His Majesty by his own shooting, beginning with year 1 up to year X. Lions fierce 102 (!)

line.1:S34-G5-(Living-Horus)-E1:D40-(bull-mighty)-G17-(with)-N28-(crowned)-H6-(Maat)
line.2G16-(Two Ladies)-S29-mn:N35:Y1-(eStablisher)-h:Q3*Z2ss-G1-(laws)-S29-W11:r-H-(pacifier)
line.3D41:N16:N16-(two-lands)-G8-(Horus-of-Gold)-O29:D36:F23-(mighty-of-thigh)-V28-A24-(smiter)-S22:G1-T14-Z3-(of-Nomads)-M23-L2-(King-South-North)
line.4< N5:V30-C10 >G39-N5:.:-(son-of)< i-mn:N35:R4-S38-R19 >(governor-Thebes)-X8-S34-(given-life)-M23-N41:X1-(Kings-Wife)
line.5< U33-N21:N21-M17-M17 >S34-U33-(Living-Tiye)(Tiye-may-She-Be-Forever-Living-(Youthful))
line.5.5r:Aa1*t-(list-of)-E22:Z2ss-(lions)
line.6W25-.:N35:N35-(Brought-In)-U36-Z1-f-(majesty-his)-m-(by)
line.6.5.:t-F29-.:t-f-(his-shooting)-I10:O34:f-(his-own)-M8-A-D36:Y1-(beginning)
line.7m-(with)-M4-t:N5-Z1-(year1)-nfr i-i-(up)-t-r-(to)-M4-t:N5-V20-(year10)-E22-(lions)
line.8H-s-Aa18-A-(fierce)-Z7-Z1-Z1-(102)

Other scarabs with this title have variations of what hieroglyphs are added or omitted because of the multiple copies made of this scarab series. (The Two Ladies are goddesses/gods of the South and North.)

References

Bibliography
 C. Blankenberg-van Delden, 1969. The large commemorative scarabs of Amenhotep III. Documenta et Monumenta Orientis Antiqui, Vol. 15. Leiden: E.J. Brill. (hardover)
 Kerrigan, 2009. The Ancients in Their Own Words, Michael Kerrigan, Fall River Press, Amber Books Ltd, c 2009. (hardcover)
 Budge, 1989 (reprint, 1893, 1925) The Mummy, A Handbook of Egyptian Funerary Archaeology, E. A. Wallis Budge, 1989, (1893, 1925), Dover Publications, (Chapter on 'Scarabs', subsection: Historical or Memorial Scarabs of Amenhotep III.) (softcover)
 Zauzich, 1992. Hieroglyphs Without Mystery: An Introduction to Ancient Egyptian Writing, Karl-Theodor Zauzich, English translation, Ann Macy Roth, c. 1992, University of Texas Press, Austin. Appendix-(problem solutions), "Hieroglyphic Sign List"-(abbreviated Gardiner's), Museum Numbers and Photo Credits for the Objects Discussed-(12 entries); 121 pages. (see for verb usage of: "May She Live"''') (softcover)

External links
 Lion-hunt scarab of Amenophis III, by Mark-Jan Nederhof.

Ancient Egyptian literature
Amenhotep III
Scarabs (artifacts)